Universidad Instituto Cultural Domínico Americano (UNICDA) is a university in Santo Domingo in the Dominican Republic.

Universities in the Dominican Republic
Education in Santo Domingo